Elizabeth Bragg (18581929) was the first woman to earn a civil engineering degree from an American university.

Biography 
Elizabeth Bragg received her degree in civil engineering from the University of California, Berkeley in 1876. Bragg married George Cumming in 1888, a civil engineer with the Southern Pacific Railroad Company and they had three sons.

Elizabeth Bragg Cumming died on 10 November 1929, and is buried in Cypress Lawn Memorial Park, Colma, San Mateo County, California.

References 

American women engineers
19th-century American engineers
American civil engineers
University of California alumni
1929 deaths
1858 births
19th-century American women